Pere Te Ruru o te Ramana Wihongi (born ), sometimes known mononymously as PERE, is a New Zealand musician, voice actor, choreographer, and kapa haka performer. He is part of the award-winning music groups Maimoa and Te Kākano.

Early life
Wihongi was born and raised in Herekino. The family moved to Auckland when Wihongi was 9, and he began attending the Te Kura Kaupapa Māori ā Rohe o Māngere immersion school. While there he competed in and won the Ngā Manu Kōrero speech competition. He then attended South Seas Film & Television School to pursue a career in television.

Career

Television
Wihongi's first job was as a production assistant, but eventually he worked his way up to be a reporter on current affairs shows such as Te Karere and Marae, and presenting the children's show Pūkana. In 2019, Wihongi started doing music and voice acting for the children's cartoon Pipi Mā. In 2021, Wihongi was a judge on the talent show 5 Minutes Of Fame.

Music
In 2015, Wihongi formed the music group Pūkana and Whānau with fellow Pūkana presenters. They changed their name to Maimoa in 2017. Maimoa appeared on the reality television shows Voices of Our Future and Waiata Nation, which documented the creation of their second single "Wairua" and their debut album Rongomaiwhiti respectively. Wihongi formed another music group, Te Kākano, in 2018.

Wihongi had his solo debut in 2019 with the single "High on Ingoingo". He won Best Māori Male Solo Artist at that years Waiata Māori Music Awards, alongside winning Best Traditional Album and Best Māori Pop Album for Te Kākano's self-titled debut album.

Film
In 2022, Wihongi joined the production company Matewa Media as the co-musical director alongside Rob Ruha for the Māori dub of the 1994 Disney film The Lion King. In addition to this role, he also provided the voice of Olaf in the dub of Frozen.

Kapa haka
Wihongi has competed in kapa haka competition Te Matatini since he was 15. He founded the kapa haka group Angitū. At Te Matatini 2023, Angitū broke gender norms by having Wihongi and Tuhoe Tamaiparea perform in the poi line.

Personal life
Wihongi identifies as takatāpui and uses both masculine and feminine pronouns. His iwi are Te Rarawa, Ngāti Kurī, Ngāpuhi, and Ngāti Wai.

Discography

Extended plays

Singles

Singles as featured artist

Promotional singles

Other charted songs

Guest appearances

References

Living people
1990s births
People from the Northland Region
Te Rarawa people
Ngāti Kurī people
Ngāpuhi people
Ngāti Wai people
Takatāpui
New Zealand LGBT singers
LGBT choreographers
New Zealand choreographers
New Zealand Māori musicians
Māori-language singers
New Zealand male voice actors